Gamma-interferon-inducible lysosomal thiol reductase is an enzyme that, in humans, is encoded by the IFI30 gene.

The protein encoded by this gene is a lysosomal thiol reductase that at low pH can reduce protein disulfide bonds. The enzyme is expressed constitutively in antigen-presenting cells and induced by gamma-interferon in other cell types. This enzyme has an important role in MHC class II-restricted antigen processing.

References

Further reading